NGC 532 is a spiral galaxy in the constellation Pisces. The galaxy is approximately 100 million light-years (30 Megaparsecs) away from the Earth, and was discovered on September 21st 1786 by the German-British astronomer William Herschel.

See also
 List of NGC objects

External links 
 SEDS

References 

Spiral galaxies
0532
Pisces (constellation)
005264